Andrea Lee (born August 15, 1998) is an American professional golfer and member of the LPGA Tour. A golf prodigy, in 2015 and 2019 she spent a total of 17 weeks as world number one in the World Amateur Golf Ranking.

Early life, college and amateur career
Lee grew up in Hermosa Beach, California. She started competing at age 8 and won 50 junior titles in four years. At 15, she qualified for the 2014 U.S. Women's Open at Pinehurst and made the cut. She finished the 2014 season as the number one ranked player in the American Junior Golf Association (AJGA) after winning two big tournaments on that circuit, the Rolex Tournament of Champions and the Yani Tseng Invitational. The latter victory earned her an exemption into the 2015 Swinging Skirts LPGA Classic where she finished tied 51st. She received a sponsor's invite for the 2015 ANA Inspiration, missing the cut by one stroke. She led Mira Costa High School to the state title in 2015.

Lee successfully represented the United States at the Junior Ryder Cup, Junior Solheim Cup and the Curtis Cup. She played in the 2016 Espirito Santo Trophy and won silver at the 2015 Pan American Games individually and in the mixed team event with Kristen Gillman, Beau Hossler and Lee McCoy. She won the team gold at the 2017 Summer Universiade in Taipei with Emilee Hoffman and Mariel Galdiano.

Lee played collegiately for Stanford University between 2016 and 2019. She became the most decorated golfer in school history, setting a school record with nine individual titles and topping the Golfweek/Sagarin College Rankings. As a freshman in 2016–17, she was WGCA Freshman of the Year, a finalist for WGCA Player of the Year, and a finalist for the Honda Sports Award for golf. 

In 2019, Lee was semi-finalist at the U.S. Women's Amateur, and won the Mark H. McCormack Medal as the world's top-ranked amateur at the end of the season.

Professional career
Lee turned professional in late 2019 after she finished T30 at the LPGA Q-Series to earn status for the 2020 LPGA Tour. In her rookie season, she made 11 cuts in 15 starts with two top-10 finishes, a tie for fifth at the Marathon Classic and a tie for seventh at the 2020 Women's British Open, to finish 48th on the money list.

Lee captured her first professional title at the 2022 Casino Del Sol Golf Classic on the Epson Tour with a par on the third hole of a playoff against her Curtis Cup teammate Lucy Li.

In September 2022, Lee won her first LPGA Tour title at the Portland Classic.

Amateur wins
2014 Rolex Tournament of Champions, Yani Tseng Invitational
2016 Windy City Collegiate Championship, East Lake Cup, Peg Barnard Invitational
2017 Women's Southern California Amateur Championship, Dick McGuire/Branch Law Firm Invitational, Stanford Intercollegiate, Nanea PAC 12 Preview
2019 Northrop Grumman Regional Challenge, Ping-ASU Invitational, Molly Collegiate Invitational

Source:

Professional wins (2)

LPGA Tour wins (1)

Epson Tour wins (1)

Results in LPGA majors
Results not in chronological order.

CUT = missed the half-way cut
NT = no tournament
T = tied

World ranking
Position in Women's World Golf Rankings at the end of each calendar year.

U.S. national team appearances
Amateur
Junior Ryder Cup: 2014 (winners)
Junior Solheim Cup: 2013 (winners), 2015 (winners)
Pan American Games: 2015
Curtis Cup: 2016, 2018 (winners)
Arnold Palmer Cup: 2018 (winners)
Espirito Santo Trophy: 2016

References

External links

American female golfers
LPGA Tour golfers
Stanford Cardinal women's golfers
Pan American Games silver medalists for the United States
Pan American Games medalists in golf
Universiade medalists in golf
Universiade gold medalists for the United States
Medalists at the 2017 Summer Universiade
Golfers at the 2015 Pan American Games
Medalists at the 2015 Pan American Games
Golfers from Los Angeles
American sportspeople of Korean descent
1998 births
Living people
20th-century American women
21st-century American women